Alexandre Leblanc de Ferrière, (18 October 1771, Bar-sur-Seine – 23 February 1848), was an 18th–19th-century French playwright, journalist, printer, publisher and writer.

Biography 
The printer and director of L'Arlequin, journal de pièces et de morceaux (1799), a journalist by the daily Le Monde (1796-1798), the head of the statistical bureau of the Interior ministry (1803), responsible for the Annales de statistique française et étrangère (1803-1804) and the Archives statistiques de la France (1804-1805), an editor for the Analyse de la statistique générale de la France published by the French Interior ministry (1803-1804), he wrote an Annuaire de Paris et des environs, published in 1838. His theatre plays were presented on the most important Parisian stages of the 18th and 19th centuries, including the Théâtre de l'Ambigu, the Théâtre de la Gaîté, the Théâtre Le Temple, and the Théâtre du Vaudeville.

Works 

1776: Les Souliers mordorés ou la Cordonnière allemande, opéra comique in 2 acts
1797: Arlequin-décorateur, comédie-parade in 1 act and in prose, mingled with vaudevilles, with Nicolas Gersin and Antoine Année
1803 – 1804: Analyse de la statistique générale de la France
1805: Holkar et Palamys, ou Les Anglais dans l'Indoustan
1806: Un voyage à Versailles, 2 vols.
1806: Ester, with Philippe-Aristide-Louis-Pierre Plancher de Valcour
1807: Un Conte des mille et une nuits, opéra comique in 1 act, music by Charles-Henri Plantade
1810: Grotius, ou le Fort de Loevesteen
1811: Charlemagne, ou les Grands jours de l'Empire français
1811: Favart à Bruxelles, comédie-vaudeville in 1 act
1812: Amour et loyauté, ou le Mariage militaire, comedy in 1 act, mingled with couplets, with Richard Fabert
1812: Arlequin-Lucifer, ou Cassandre alchimiste, folie in 1 act mingled with couplets, with Fabert
1813: Archambaud ou Amour et devoir, melodrama in 3 acts
1813: La Coutume écossaise ou Le Mariage sur la frontière, comédie-vaudeville in 1 act, with Charles Rondeau
1814: Les Trois talismans, melodrama in 3 acts and extravaganza
1816: Éléonore de Lusignan, melodrama in 3 acts, with Jean Edme Paccard
1816: Marguerite de Strafford, ou le Retour à la royauté, melodrama in 3 acts, in prose and extravaganza, with Desprez
1816: Le Mariage sous d'heureux auspices, vaudeville in 1 act, with Desprez
1816: Opinion sur le divorce considéré sous le rapport de la religion et des mœurs
1817: Inès, ou les Devoirs d'un roi, melodrama in 3 acts and extravaganza
1817: Hassem, ou la vengeance, melodrama in 3 acts
1818: Les Deux ambitions
1818: L'Incendie du village, ou les Représailles militaires, melodrama in 3 acts, extravaganza, with Jean-Baptiste Dubois
1819: Grégoire à Tunis, ou les Bons effets du vin, vaudeville in 1 act, with Aimé Desprez
1822: L'Actrice en voyage, vaudeville in 1 act, with Carron de Morcourt and Gaspard Tourret
1822: Les Deux baillis, ou le Mariage par procuration, comedy in 1 act, in prose
1825: La Fille du musicien, drama in 3 acts, with Edmond Crosnier
1825: La Comtesse de Tarascon, ou Dix années d'absence, anecdote du XIIIe siècle
1831: L'Hôtel des princes, opéra comique in 1 act, music by Eugène Prévost
1834: Jane Gray, drama in 3 acts and 5 tableaux, music by François Bellon, preceded with 6 juillet 1553, prologue in 1 act
1837: Annuaire de Paris et de ses environs dans un rayon de dix lieues
1838: Les Étouffeurs, drama in 2 acts, with Charles Foliguet
1838: Paris et ses environs, description historique, statistique et monumentale
1842: Lequel ?, comédie-vaudeville in 1 act, with Louis Berthier and Pierre Tournemine
1845: Introduction à l'étude philosophique de la phrénologie

Bibliography 
 Joseph Marie Quérard, La France littéraire, ou Dictionnaire bibliographique des savants, 1829, (p. 114)
 Jean-Dominique Mellot et Élisabeth Queval, avec la collaboration d'Antoine Monaque, Répertoire d'imprimeurs-libraires (c. 1500 – c. 1810), Service de l'Inventaire rétrospectif des fonds imprimés de la Bibliothèque nationale de France, 2004.

External links 
 Alexandre de Ferrière on Data.bnf.fr

1771 births
1848 deaths
People from Bar-sur-Seine
19th-century French journalists
French male journalists
18th-century French dramatists and playwrights
19th-century French dramatists and playwrights
French printers
French publishers (people)
19th-century French male writers
18th-century French male writers